Jefrey Payeras (born October 16, 1993) is an American-born Guatemalan soccer player who plays as a defender.

In August 2016, Payeras made his debut for Guatemala in a friendly 0–0 tie against Panama.

Honors
C.S.D. Municipal
Clausura: 2017

References

External links
 USL Pro profile

1993 births
Living people
Sportspeople from Hawthorne, California
People with acquired Guatemalan citizenship
Guatemalan footballers
Guatemala international footballers
American soccer players
United States men's youth international soccer players
Orange County SC players
Soccer players from California
USL Championship players
United States men's under-20 international soccer players
LA Galaxy II players
Cerritos Falcons men's soccer players
Association football defenders
American people of Guatemalan descent
American sportspeople of North American descent
Sportspeople of Guatemalan descent
C.S.D. Municipal players